Ed, Edd n Eddy is a 69-episode (130-segment) animated comedy television series created by Danny Antonucci and produced by Canada-based a.k.a. Cartoon. The series debuted on Cartoon Network in the United States on January 4, 1999, and ended on November 8, 2009, with the film Ed, Edd n Eddy's Big Picture Show. The series was originally planned to air for four seasons, but Cartoon Network ordered two additional seasons, four specials, and a film as a result of its popularity, for a total of 135 stories. The series revolves around three adolescent boys collectively known as "the Eds", who live in a suburban cul-de-sac. Unofficially led by Eddy, the Eds frequently try to obtain money from other children in their cul-de-sac in order to purchase jawbreakers. The Eds' plans usually fail and leave them in various predicaments.

Feeling confined to gross and edgy work, such as his previous series The Brothers Grunt, artist Danny Antonucci decided to produce an animated children's television show similar to classic cartoons from the 1940s to the 1970s. Antonucci spent months designing the show before trying to sell it to Nickelodeon and Cartoon Network. Both studios reacted enthusiastically and wanted to see more but demanded creative control, which Antonucci refused. Cartoon Network commissioned the show after they agreed to let Antonucci go in his own direction. The first two seasons were released on DVD in 2006 and 2007. Two DVD volumes were also released: Edifying Ed-Ventures on May 10, 2005, in Region 1 and in Region 2 on May 16, 2006, and Fools' Par-Ed-Ise on March 31, 2006, in Region 1. Selected episodes were featured in Cartoon Network compilation DVDs. The first five seasons, in addition to the Big Picture Show film are available for download on the iTunes Store. The Halloween special "Ed, Edd n Eddy's Boo Haw Haw" is available as part of "Cartoon Network's Super Scary Showcase" on the iTunes Store, but only to the UK. The complete first and second season DVDs can be rented from Netflix, while the third season and the fourth season can be streamed from the same service. The third season can be downloaded from the Google Play store and Amazon.com.

Ed, Edd n Eddy received generally positive reviews from critics. Viewed from 31 million households worldwide in 29 countries, Ed, Edd n Eddy was popular among both younger and older viewers. During its run, the series won a Reuben Award, two Leo Awards and a SOCAN Award out of a total of 11 award nominations, which include one Reuben Award, six Leo Awards, one Annie Award, two Kids' Choice Awards and the SOCAN Award. It remains the longest-running original Cartoon Network series and Canadian-made animated series to date.

Series overview

Episodes

Season 1 (1999)

Season 2 (1999–2000)

Season 3 (2001–2002)

Season 4 (2002–2004)

Holiday specials (2004–2005)

Season 5 (2005–2007)

CN Invaded Special (2007)

Season 6 (2008)

Television film (2009)

References
General
 
 
 
 
 
 
 
 
Specific

External links
 List of Ed, Edd n Eddy episodes at epguides

Lists of Cartoon Network television series episodes

Ed, Edd n Eddy